Liturgusa krattorum is a species of mantis that was discovered by Gavin Svenson and the Cleveland Museum of Natural History. These species of mantis are mainly found in Peru. They live in tall trees, where they are preyed upon by predators such as monkeys and birds. The species themselves prey upon smaller insects, using their great speed in order to catch and kill prey. In a similar method to species such as cheetah, however ambush predator behaviors have been observed. The species was named after Martin Kratt and Chris Kratt, the hosts of Kratts' Creatures, Zoboomafoo, and Wild Kratts on PBS Kids, as well as Be the Creature on National Geographic.

Wild Kratts 
In 2017, a special episode of the PBS Kids' original show Wild Kratts with the same title as the scientific name of the mantis was released, which featured the animated counterparts of the Kratt Brothers adventuring with a member of the species. In the live-action closing of the episode, the brothers personally thanked Svenson for naming the mantis after them.

See also 
 List of mantis genera and species

References 

Liturgusidae
Insects described in 2014